The 2011 European Canoe Slalom Championships took place in La Seu d'Urgell, Catalonia, Spain between June 9 and June 12, 2011 under the auspices of the European Canoe Association (ECA). It was the 12th edition. The races were held in Parc Olímpic del Segre which is known for hosting the canoe slalom events of the 1992 Summer Olympics.

Medal summary

Men's results

Canoe

Kayak

Women's results

Canoe

Kayak

Medal table

References
 Official results
 European Canoe Association

European Canoe Slalom Championships
European Canoe Slalom Championships
European Canoe Slalom Championships
European Canoe Slalom Championships
La Seu d'Urgell
Canoe Slalom European Championships
Canoeing and kayaking competitions in Spain